Flesh Is Heir  is the third full-length album from The Amenta, released March 25, 2013.

Track listing

Credits

Personnel
Cain Cressall - vocals
Erik Miehs - guitar
Timothy Pope - keyboards, samples, programming
Dan Quinlan - bass guitar
Robin Stone - drums

Additional personnel
Melek-Tha - samples, programming (track 10)

Production
Alan Douches - mastering
Erik Miehs - mixing
Jess Mathews - photography
Mathew Vickerstaff - artwork, layout

References

2013 albums
The Amenta albums